Kirin Holdings is a Japanese holdings group with the following major subsidiaries:

 Kirin Company, an integrated beverages company. Its major operating units include Kirin Brewery Company, Limited, Mercian Corporation and Kirin Beverages Company, Limited.
 Kyowa Kirin, a pharmaceutical company